Atayal may refer to:

 Atayal people
 Atayal language

Language and nationality disambiguation pages